Spoonflower is an on-demand, digital printing company that prints custom fabric, wallpaper, and home decor.

It was founded in May 2008 by Stephen Fraser and Gart Davis, both formerly of Lulu.com. In January 2020 Michael Jones, formerly of ChannelAdvisor and eBay, became CEO. 

It was headquartered in Mebane, North Carolina, USA until 2010. Its current headquarters are in Durham, North Carolina, USA and Neukölln, Berlin, Germany. The largest investor in the company is Guidepost Growth Equity of Boston. Other investors include Allison Polish, the former company president.

In August 2012, the Spoonflower community numbered over 600,000 individuals who use their own fabric to make curtains, quilts, clothes, bags, furniture, dolls, pillows, framed artwork, costumes, banners and much, much more. The Spoonflower Marketplace currently offers the largest collection of independent fabric designers in the world.

Spoonflower's digital textile printers are large-format inkjet printers specially modified to run fabric. Unlike conventional textile manufacturing, digital printing entails very little waste of fabric, ink, water or electricity. Spoonflower prints using eco-friendly, water-based inks on natural and synthetic fiber textiles. No additional chemicals are used in the printing or preparation process.

All Spoonflower fabric gets printed in Durham, North Carolina and Berlin, Neukölln.

Spoonflower was acquired by Shutterfly in 2021.

References

American companies established in 2008
Companies based in Durham, North Carolina
Manufacturing companies based in North Carolina
Textile companies of the United States